Linda Scott is a Labor Party Councillor on the City of Sydney Council, first elected in 2012 and re-elected in 2016 and 2021. She served as Deputy Lord Mayor between September 2018 and September 2019.

In November 2020 Councillor Scott was elected unopposed as the President of the Australian Local Government Association, having been vice president since November 2018 and a board member since 2017.
Linda serves on the National Federation Reform Council with Australia’s Prime Minister, Premiers and Treasurers, and a range of National Cabinet subcommittees. 

Linda previously served as the first female President of Local Government NSW from 2017 to 2021, having served as a board member since 2015. As LGNSW President, she  successfully secured $8 billion in local government funding, including the doubling of library funding for NSW local government libraries, led a state-wide campaign to save recycling and successfully advocated for fairer and more transparent electoral funding laws.

During her time on the City of Sydney Council, she has successfully advocated for increased action on climate change, more affordable housing and green spaces, increased early education and care centres, new skate parks, and spearheaded City action to fight racism.

Linda also currently serves as the Chair of CareSuper, an award winning industry superannuation fund growing the retirement incomes of more than 200,000 Australians, having served as a Director since 2018.

Background
Scott graduated with first class honours in Psychology from the University of New South Wales and was an elected student member of the University's governing body, the University Council, which overturned a policy to accept Full Fee-paying undergraduate students into the University. She worked at the University of Sydney and the NSW Bureau of Crime Statistics and Research.

Scott served as a member alongside former Australian of the Year Dr John Yu and former Hawke Government Federal Education Minister Susan Ryan. She is also a former Convener of Labor for Refugees and former Chair of the Surry Hills Neighbourhood Centre.

She is a non-executive Board Director and a Graduate of the Australian Institute of Company Directors. She has served on a range of NSW Government boards and advisory groups, including currently on the NSW Environmental Trust, and previously on the Local Government Ministerial Advisory Group and NSW Smart Places Advisory Committee.

Scott currently volunteers as a mentor for the University of Sydney Dalyell Program, raises funds for homelessness services in the annual Vinnies CEO Sleepout and is a Justice of the Peace.

She is a regular media commentator, having appeared on panel shows such as The Drum (ABC), The Project (TEN) and the Paul Murray Program (Sky).

Local Government career
Scott won Labor's first community preselection, where over 4,000 people elected her to be Labor's candidate for Lord Mayor of the City of Sydney in the 2012 NSW Local Government Elections. She defeated a host of other high-profile candidates to be selected.

She has also campaigned to save and increase inner city green spaces and burying cables underground to enable more kerbside space to plant more trees. She successfully called on the city to invest in community infrastructure, like skating facilities, a new City Farm in Sydney Park and more sporting facilities. Scott has sought City action to address housing affordability and a better deal for those in public housing.

A supporter of the "Recognise" campaign, Linda has successfully moved to have signage identifying Aboriginal and Torres Strait heritage names installed across the City of Sydney, following the idea championed by Hetti Perkins. Scott also opposed the sale of heritage public housing in Millers Point, Dawes Point and The Rocks, where her grandmother once lived, and campaigned to preserve industrial heritage.

During her term on council, Scott has argued for significant investment in new early education centres, more before-and-after-school care and public libraries. Scott also supported a campaign to build a giant rainbow flag in recognition of the LGBT community in Sydney's Taylor Square, which saw the permanent monument erected in 2012. Scott is a supporter of live music and street art.

In December 2017, Scott was elected to succeed Keith Rhoades as President of Local Government NSW, becoming the first female and first Labor president of the organisation since the merger of the Local Government Association and the Local Shires Association in 2013.

On 17 September 2018, Scott was elected to serve a single term as Deputy Lord Mayor, defeating fellow councillor Christine Forster.

References

Women local councillors in Australia
Living people
Politicians from Sydney
University of New South Wales alumni
Year of birth missing (living people)
Deputy Lord Mayors of Sydney
Australian Labor Party councillors
Sydney City Councillors